Terra Kulture is an arts and culture center in Lagos with an attached restaurant.

Establishment

Nigerian lawyer Bolanle Austen-Peters founded Terra Kulture in 2003.

The center is a restaurant, serving Nigerian cuisine, bookstore and cultural venue, hosting exhibitions of Nigerian art, theater, and book readings as well as language classes in the three main Nigerian languages, Hausa, Ibo and Yoruba. 

Annual events at Terra Kulture includes an art auction and the Taruwa festival of Performing arts.

Terra Arena
Terra Kulture launched its 450-seater theatre called Terra Kulture Arena, situated at its headquarters Tiamiyu Savage Crescent, Victoria Island, Lagos, Nigeria.

Terra Academy For The Arts (TAFTA)
Terra Kulture is also currently in partnership with Mastercard Foundation to empower 65,000 Young Nigerians, an initiative that would form a significant part of the Terra Academy For The Arts (TAFTA) Program.

In October 2022, Terra Kulture received a donation from global streaming platform Netflix, which the company plans to industry and community focused areas of engagement like academic training, bookstore and theatre.

References

External links
 Official website

Restaurants in Lagos
Cultural venues in Lagos
Cultural promotion organizations
Cultural organizations based in Nigeria
Companies based in Lagos
2003 establishments in Nigeria
Theatres in Lagos